Judy Collins #3 is the third studio album by American singer and songwriter Judy Collins, released by Elektra Records in 1963. It spent 10 weeks on the Billboard Pop album charts in 1964, peaking at No. 126.

Jim (later Roger) McGuinn worked as an arranger and played guitar and banjo on the album. He would later bring with him the acoustic arrangements of the Pete Seeger songs "Turn! Turn! Turn! (To Everything There Is a Season)" and "The Bells of Rhymney", as well as the notion of performing and recording alternate, abstracted versions of Bob Dylan songs, when he went on to co-found the folk rock group the Byrds.

Track listing
Side one
 "Anathea" (Neil Roth, Lydia Wood) – 4:00
 "Bullgine Run" (Traditional) – 2:05
 "Farewell" (Bob Dylan) – 3:25
 "Hey Nelly Nelly" (Shel Silverstein, Jim Friedman) – 2:46
 "Ten O'Clock All Is Well" (Hamilton Camp, Bob Gibson) – 3:43
 "The Dove" (Ewan MacColl) – 2:12
 "Masters of War" (Dylan) – 3:21

Side two
 "In the Hills of Shiloh" (Silverstein, Friedman) – 3:35 
 "The Bells of Rhymney" (Idris Davies, Pete Seeger) – 4:04
 "Deportee" (Woody Guthrie, Martin Hoffman) – 4:35
 "Settle Down" (Mike Settle) – 2:21
 "Come Away Melinda" (Fran Minkoff, Fred Hellerman) – 2:45
 "Turn! Turn! Turn! / To Everything There Is a Season" (Ecclesiastes, Seeger) – 3:35

Personnel
Judy Collins – guitar, keyboards, vocals

Additional musicians
Walter Raim – 12-string guitar (tracks 4, 9), banjo (track 8)
Jim McGuinn – second guitar, banjo
Bill Takas – double bass

Technical
Mark Abramson – co-producer
Jac Holzman – co-producer
William S. Harvey – cover design
Jim Marshall – cover photo
Jim McGuinn – arrangements (tracks 1–3, 5–8, 10–13)
Walter Raim – arrangements (tracks 4, 9)
Judy Collins – liner notes

Notes

1963 albums
Judy Collins albums
Albums produced by Mark Abramson
Albums produced by Jac Holzman
Elektra Records albums